Leda and the Swan is a classical myth.

Leda and the Swan may also refer to:

Leda and the Swan (Copenhagen), statue
Leda and the Swan (Correggio), an oil on canvas painting by Correggio
Leda and the Swan (Galleria Borghese)
Leda and the Swan (Leonardo), lost painting
Leda and the Swan (Michelangelo), a lost tempera on canvas painting by Michelangelo
Leda and the Swan (Peter Paul Rubens), a painting surviving in two versions
Leda and the Swan (Tintoretto)
Leda and the Swan (Uffizi)
Leda and the Swan (Wilton House), painting by Cesare da Sesto

See also 
Leda (disambiguation)
Leda Atomica, a painting by Salvador Dalí